Justin Jose Portillo (born September 9, 1992) is an American soccer player who currently plays for New Mexico United.

Career
Portillo was raised in New Orleans and played at Coastal Carolina University, becoming the school's all-time leader in appearances.

Portillo signed a professional contract with USL Pro club Charleston Battery on March 19, 2014.  He made his professional debut three days later in a 1–1 draw with Orlando City. At the end of the 2014 season, Portillo was voted the club's newcomer of the year after establishing himself as a key starter in central midfield.

After a season with USL side Real Monarchs, Portillo joined MLS side Real Salt Lake on February 26, 2019. Following the 2021 season, Portillo's contract option was declined by Salt Lake.

On December 18, 2021, Portillo joined USL Championship side New Mexico United ahead of their 2022 season. On May 31, 2022, Portillo was named USL Championship Player of the Week for Week 12 in recognition of his brace and assist against Phoenix Rising FC and his additional goal against Indy Eleven.

References

External links
Coastal Carolina bio

1992 births
Living people
American expatriate soccer players
American soccer players
American sportspeople of Salvadoran descent
Association football midfielders
Baton Rouge Capitals players
Charleston Battery players
Coastal Carolina Chanticleers men's soccer players
Expatriate soccer players in Canada
K-W United FC players
Reading United A.C. players
Real Monarchs players
Real Salt Lake players
Salvadoran footballers
Soccer players from Louisiana
Sportspeople from New Orleans
USL Championship players
USL League Two players
Major League Soccer players
New Mexico United players